CJMR is a Canadian radio station, which broadcasts multicultural programming at AM 1320. Although officially licensed to Mississauga, Ontario, it currently broadcasts from studios in Oakville. CJMR's studios are located on Church Street in downtown Oakville, while its transmitters are located along Dundas Street West near Third Line Road on the northwest side of Oakville.

Originally a daytimer on AM 1190, CJMR was launched in 1974 by the owners of CHWO. In 1990, the station moved to its current frequency and began a 24-hour broadcast schedule. Formerly a mixture of multilingual and Christian programming, CJMR moved to exclusively multilingual programming in 2001 when the religious programming moved to the new CJYE.

In 1986, the station was denied a licence to move to the FM dial. CJMR and CHMB are the only stations in Canada which broadcast on 1320 AM.

CJMR's programming is mainly South Asian (Hindi and Punjabi) with some Croatian, Dutch, Filipino, Gujarati, Italian, Mandarin, Polish, Portuguese, Romanian, Spanish, Ukrainian and Urdu programming in the evenings and on weekends.

References

External links
 CJMR
 
 

Mass media in Mississauga
JMR
JMR
Radio stations established in 1974
1974 establishments in Ontario